Derek Davis may refer to:

Derek Davis (1948–2015), Irish broadcaster
Derek Davis (artist) (1926–2008), English artist
Derek Russell Davis (1914–1993), British psychiatrist